Jablonové may refer to several villages in Slovakia:

Jablonové, Bytča District in the Žilina Region
Jablonové, Malacky District in the Bratislava Region

See also
Jablonov - Prešov Region
 Jabłonowo (disambiguation) Polish toponym
 Yablonovo Russian toponym